Sumantra Ghoshal (26 September 19483 March 2004) was an Indian scholar and educator. He served as a Professor of Strategic and International Management at the London Business School, and was the founding Dean of the Indian School of Business in Hyderabad.

His Managing Across Borders: The Transnational Solution,  co-authored with Christopher A. Bartlett, has been listed in the Financial Times as one of the 50 most influential management books, and has been translated into nine languages.

Biography 
Born in Calcutta, Ghoshal attended the Ballygaunge Government High School, and graduated from Delhi University with Physics major and at the Indian Institute of Social Welfare and Business Management.

Ghoshal started his career in industry. He worked for Indian Oil Corporation, rising through the management ranks before moving to the United States on a Fulbright Fellowship and Humphrey Fellowship in 1981. Ghoshal was awarded an S.M. and a PhD from the MIT Sloan School of Management in 1983 and 1985 respectively, and was also awarded a D.B.A. degree from Harvard Business School in 1986. He worked on these degrees at the same time, writing two distinct dissertations on two different topics.

In 1985, Ghoshal joined INSEAD Business School in France and wrote a stream of influential articles and books. In 1994, he joined the London Business School. Ghoshal was a Fellow of the Advanced Institute of Management Research (AIM) in the United Kingdom and a Professor of Strategic and International Management at the London Business School. He served as a member of The Committee of Overseers of the Harvard Business School.

Ghoshal married Sushmita and they had two sons. He died of a brain hemorrhage on 3 March 2004.

Awards 
 The Differential Network: Organizing the Multinational Corporation for Value Creation, a book he co-authored with Nitin Nohria, won the George Terry Book Award in 1997.
 The Individualized Corporation:A Fundamentally New Approach to Management, co-authored with Christopher A. Bartlett, won the Igor Ansoff Award in 1997, and has been translated into seven languages.
 His last book Managing Radical Change, won the Management Book of the Year award in India. He was described by The Economist as 'Euroguru'.
 He ranks 40th on the list of Top 50 business intellectuals published by the Accenture consulting company in 2002.

Work 
Ghoshal's early work focused on the matrix structure in multinational organizations, and the "conflict and confusion" that reporting along both geographical and functional lines created. His later work is more ambitious, and hence perhaps more important – the idea that it is necessary to halt economics from taking over management. This, he theorised, is important since firms do not play on the periphery of human life today, but have taken a central role.

Forms of the international enterprise 
In collaboration with Christopher A. Bartlett, Ghoshal researched successful enterprises on international markets. They found three types of internationalization, differing in structural approach and strategic capabilities. The types were dubbed Multinational, Global and International.

Due to an ever-faster changing environment, Bartlett and Ghoshal see a further need for adaptation with a drive toward a company, that masters not one, but all three of the strategic capabilities of the named types. The ideal-type thus created, they dubbed the transnational enterprise.

Management context and individual behavior model 
Also with Bartlett in 1997, Ghoshal set up a management context and individual behavior model highlighting a context shaped by stretch, trust, support, and discipline. They identified that kind of context as a cornerstone that elicits behaviours of the individual which contribute to an organisation's self-renewal, allowing the organisation to be vigorous and energetic.

Legacy 
Ghoshal's treatment of management issues at the level of the individual led him to conclude that management theory that focuses on the economic aspects of man to the exclusion of all others is incorrect at best. According to him, "A theory that assumes that managers cannot be relied upon by shareholders can make managers less reliable."

Such theory, Ghoshal warned, would become a self-fulfilling prophecy, a particularly stinging critique of the output of a majority of his colleagues in business schools that made him controversial. To his death, his fight was against the "narrow idea" that led to today's management theory being "undersocialized and one-dimensional, a parody of the human condition more appropriate to a prison or a madhouse than an institution which should be a force for good."

Publications 
Ghoshal published 10 books, over 70 articles, and several award-winning case studies. Books, a selection:
 Bartlett, Christopher A., and Sumantra Ghoshal. Managing across borders: The transnational solution. Vol. 2. Harvard Business School Press, 1999.
 Bartlett, Christopher A., and Sumantra Ghoshal. Transnational management. Vol. 4. McGraw Hill, 2000.

Articles, a selection:
 Ghoshal, Sumantra. "Global strategy: An organizing framework." Strategic management journal 8.5 (1987): 425–440.
 Ghoshal, Sumantra, and Christopher A. Bartlett. "The multinational corporation as an inter-organizational network." Academy of management review 15.4 (1990): 603–626.
 Ghoshal, Sumantra, and Peter Moran. "Bad for practice: A critique of the transaction cost theory." Academy of management Review 21.1 (1996): 13–47.
 Tsai, Wenpin, and Sumantra Ghoshal. "Social capital and value creation: The role of intrafirm networks." Academy of management Journal 41.4 (1998): 464–476.
 Nahapiet, Janine, and Sumantra Ghoshal. "Social capital, intellectual capital, and the organizational advantage." Academy of management review 23.2 (1998): 242–266.
 Ghoshal, Sumantra. "Bad management theories are destroying good management practices." Academy of Management Learning & Education 4.1 (2005): 75–91.
 Rocha, Hector and Ghoshal, Sumantra. "Beyond Self-Interest Revisited." Journal of Management Studies 43(3) (2006): 585–619.
Ghoshal featured on the list of The Case Centre's all-time top authors list (covering 40 years) released in 2014.

References

1948 births
2004 deaths
MIT Sloan School of Management alumni
Harvard Business School alumni
Bengali writers
20th-century Bengalis
Bengali Hindus
Bengali educators
Indian Institute of Social Welfare and Business Management alumni
University of Calcutta alumni
Academic staff of INSEAD
Indian advertising people
Business educators
Bestselling case authors
Educators from West Bengal
Indian writers
20th-century Indian writers
Indian non-fiction writers
Indian male non-fiction writers
20th-century Indian non-fiction writers
20th-century Indian male writers
Indian male writers
Indian scholars
20th-century Indian educational theorists
20th-century Indian scholars
Indian business writers
Indian business theorists
Indian educators
20th-century Indian educators
Indian male essayists
20th-century Indian essayists
Indian essayists
Indian economics writers
Indian columnists
Academic staff of the Indian School of Business
Indian academic administrators
Indian university and college faculty deans